The Delaware lunar sample displays are two commemorative plaques consisting of small fragments of Moon specimen brought back with the Apollo 11 and Apollo 17 lunar missions and given in the 1970s to the people of the state of Delaware by United States President Richard Nixon as goodwill gifts.

Description

Apollo 11

Apollo 17

History 
The Delaware Apollo 11 "goodwill Moon rocks" plaque display was stolen in 1976.

The Delaware Apollo 17 lunar samples plaque display is held in storage by the Delaware Division of Historical and Cultural Affairs. Exhibits of the display are rare.

See also
 List of Apollo lunar sample displays

References

Further reading 

 

Stolen and missing moon rocks
Tourist attractions in Dover, Delaware